Cercospora theae is a fungal plant pathogen. It is the pathogen that causes bird's eye spot disease in tea plants.

References

External links

theae
Fungal plant pathogens and diseases